Lucinda Armstrong Hall is an Australian actress. She is noted for her recurring television role as Holly Hoyland in Neighbours, and for her performance in Ingrid Veninger's film Porcupine Lake, for which she received a Canadian Screen Award nomination for Best Supporting Actress at the 6th Canadian Screen Awards.

References

External links

Australian child actresses
Australian film actresses
Australian television actresses
Living people
Year of birth missing (living people)
21st-century Australian actresses
Australian soap opera actresses